Marlene Belfort (born 1945) is an American biochemist known for her research on the factors that interrupt genes and proteins. She is a fellow of the American Academy of Arts and Sciences and has been admitted to the United States National Academy of Sciences.

Education and career 
Belfort was one of the first undergraduate women to study microbiology at the University of Cape Town where she received her bachelor's degree in 1965 and an earned an honors degree in physiological chemistry in 1966. She went on to earn her Ph.D. from the University of California, Irvine in 1972 and did postdoctoral research at the Hebrew University, Jerusalem and Northwestern University. As of 2021, she is a Distinguished Professor in the Departments of Biological Sciences and Biomedical Sciences at SUNY at Albany and the RNA Institute.

Research 
Belfort's early research was on a gene involved in thymidylate synthase in the bacteria Escherichia coli. and its T4 phage. She subsequently found a bacterial structural gene in this virus, which was the first example of a intron-containing prokaryotic structural gene. Prior to her research, this junk DNA was only known to occur in more complex organisms. Her research then determined that the gene of the T4 phage was processed by RNA in a mechanism known as splicing and was excised from the transcript during processing in the cell, and led to the observation that the processing of the T4 phage RNA is similar to the splicing pathway used by eukaryotes Her work subsequently showed that the introns move to different places within a bacterial genome and she was able to determine the mechanism guiding this movement of genetic material. Her most recent research also includes self-cleaving inteins, which are protein-splicing elements. Because inteins are sometimes found in essential proteins, her group is exploring whether inhibitors of intein splicing could be used as anti-fungal drugs.   Belfort has also collaborated with Joachim Frank, a 2017 Nobel Prize winner in chemistry, in studying three-dimensional images of group II introns

Selected publications

Awards 
Fellow, American Academy of Arts and Sciences (1994)
Elected member, United States National Academy of Sciences (1999)
Excellence in Research, University of Albany (2000)
Alice C. Evans Award, American Society for Microbiology (2002)
Distinguished Professor, State University of New York (2003)
Doctor of Science (honoris causa), University of Cape Town (2019)
Mid-career Leadership Award, American Society for Biochemistry and Molecular Biology (2022)

References

External links

, December 17, 2019
The Belfort lab at the University of Albany

1945 births
American women biochemists
Fellows of the American Academy of Arts and Sciences
Living people
Members of the United States National Academy of Sciences
University of California, Irvine alumni
University of Cape Town alumni
University at Albany, SUNY faculty
Molecular biologists
21st-century American women